Dean Dillon (born Larry Dean Flynn; March 26, 1955) is an American country musician and songwriter. Between 1982 and 1993, he recorded six studio albums on various labels, and charted several singles on the Billboard country charts. Since 1993, Dillon has continued to write hit songs for other artists, most notably George Strait.

In 2002, Dillon was inducted into the Nashville Songwriters Hall of Fame. In 2020, he was inducted into the Country Music Hall of Fame.

Early life 
Dean Dillon was born Larry Dean Flynn on March 26, 1955, in Lake City, Tennessee, where he was raised. He began playing the guitar at the age of seven, and when he was 15 he made his first public appearance as a singer and performer in the Knoxville variety show Jim Clayton Startime. After completing Oak Ridge High School in 1973 he hitchhiked to Nashville with hopes of starting a music career. Dillon first recorded on the Plantation label as Dean Rutherford, and then as Dean Dalton. Upon moving to RCA Records, he was persuaded to change his recording name; record executive Jerry Bradley randomly picked the name Dillon from a telephone book.

Career

Recording artist
As a recording artist between 1979 and 1983, Dillon charted eight times, including one top 30 hit, "I'm into the Bottle (To Get You out of My Mind)".  He was featured on several duet albums with songwriting partner Gary Stewart. Early songwriting success earned Dillon a recording deal with Capitol Records for  whom he released two studio albums. In 1991, now at Atlantic Records, Dillon released his most successful and most recent studio album, Out of Your Ever Lovin' Mind.

Songwriter
As a songwriter, early successes includes David Allan Coe's 1981 hit "Tennessee Whiskey". Dillon has written many singles for George Strait, including "The Chair", "Nobody in His Right Mind Would've Left Her", "It Ain't Cool to Be Crazy About You", "Ocean Front Property", "Famous Last Words of a Fool", "I've Come to Expect It from You", "If I Know Me", "Easy Come, Easy Go", "Lead On", "The Best Day", "She Let Herself Go", "Living for the Night", "Drinkin' Man", and "I Believe". Strait and his son Bubba co-wrote the latter three with Dillon.

Record label
In 2018 he met Sundance Head at a Houston Rodeo and fell in love with his voice. "The first time I heard 'Dance' I thought, 'where has THIS guy been hiding? I've been in this business all my life, and with the exception of a couple of people, I've never heard anybody sing the way this man does. He is extremely special," says Dillon. With the help of business associates from Texas Dean Dillon create his own record label WildCatter Records, signing Sundance Head. On January 25, 2019, their first album together, Stained Glass and Neon, was released.

Personal life
Dillon's daughter, Jessie Jo Dillon, is also a songwriter.  He also has another daughter, named Song, who is also a singer songwriter.

Discography

Albums

Singles

Music videos

Songs written
Dillon has worked with a younger generation of country stars including Toby Keith and Kenny Chesney. In 2002, he was inducted into the Nashville Songwriters Hall of Fame along with Bob Dylan and Shel Silverstein. Dillon co-wrote two songs on Toby Keith's 2005 album Honkytonk University, and five on his 2006 album White Trash with Money, including the single "A Little Too Late".

Dillon has either written or co-written the following singles for other artists:

References

External links
 Dean Dillon official website

1955 births
American male singer-songwriters
American country singer-songwriters
Living people
People from Rocky Top, Tennessee
RCA Records Nashville artists
Capitol Records artists
Atlantic Records artists
Singer-songwriters from Tennessee
Country musicians from Tennessee
Country Music Hall of Fame inductees